Peter Michael Falk (September 16, 1927 – June 23, 2011) was an American film and television actor. He is best known for his role as Lieutenant Columbo in the long-running NBC series Columbo (1968–1978, 1989–2003), for which he won four Primetime Emmy Awards (1972, 1975, 1976, 1990) and a Golden Globe Award (1973). In 1996, TV Guide ranked Falk No. 21 on its 50 Greatest TV Stars of All Time list. He received a posthumous star on the Hollywood Walk of Fame in 2013.

He first starred as Columbo in two 2-hour "World Premiere" TV pilots; the first with Gene Barry in 1968 and the second with Lee Grant in 1971. The show then aired as part of The NBC Mystery Movie series from 1971 to 1978, and again on ABC from 1989 to 2003.

Falk was twice nominated for the Academy Award for Best Supporting Actor, for Murder, Inc. (1960) and Pocketful of Miracles (1961), and won his first Emmy Award in 1962 for The Dick Powell Theatre. He was the first actor to be nominated for an Academy Award and an Emmy Award in the same year, achieving the feat twice (1961 and 1962). He went on to appear in such films as It's a Mad, Mad, Mad, Mad World (1963), The Great Race (1965), Anzio (1968), Murder by Death (1976), The Cheap Detective (1978), The Brink's Job (1978), The In-Laws (1979), The Princess Bride (1987), Wings of Desire (1987), The Player (1992), and Next (2007), as well as many television guest roles.

Falk was also known for his collaborations with filmmaker, actor, and personal friend John Cassavetes acting in films such as Husbands (1970), A Woman Under the Influence (1974), Elaine May's Mikey and Nicky (1976) and the Columbo episode "Étude in Black" (1972).

Early life

Born in The Bronx, New York City, Falk was the son of Michael Peter Falk (1898–1981), owner of a clothing and dry goods store, and his wife, Madeline (née Hochhauser; 1904–2001), an accountant and buyer. Both his parents were Jewish, coming from Poland and Russia on his father's side and from Hungary and Łabowa, Nowy Sącz County, Poland, on his mother's side. Falk grew up in Ossining, New York.

Falk's right eye was surgically removed when he was three because of a retinoblastoma. He wore an artificial eye for most of his life. The artificial eye was the cause of his trademark squint. Despite this limitation, as a boy he participated in team sports, mainly baseball and basketball. In a 1997 interview in Cigar Aficionado magazine with Arthur Marx, Falk said: "I remember once in high school the umpire called me out at third base when I was sure I was safe. I got so mad I took out my glass eye, handed it to him and said, 'Try this.' I got such a laugh you wouldn't believe."

Falk's first stage appearance was at  age 12 in The Pirates of Penzance at Camp High Point in upstate New York, where one of his camp counselors was Ross Martin. Falk attended Ossining High School in Westchester County, New York, where he was a star athlete and president of his senior class. He  graduated in 1945.

Falk briefly attended Hamilton College in Clinton, New York. He then tried to join the armed services, as World War II was drawing to a close. Rejected because of his missing eye, he joined the United States Merchant Marine and served as a cook and mess boy. Falk said of the experience in 1997: "There they don't care if you're blind or not. The only one on a ship who has to see is the captain. And in the case of the Titanic, he couldn't see very well, either." Falk recalls this period in his autobiography: "A year on the water was enough for me, so I returned to college. I didn't stay long. Too itchy. What to do next? I signed up to go to Israel to fight in the war on its attack on Egypt. I wasn't passionate about Israel, I wasn't passionate about Egypt—I just wanted more excitement … I got assigned a ship and departure date but the war was over before the ship ever sailed."

After a year and a half in the Merchant Marine, Falk returned to Hamilton College and also attended the University of Wisconsin. He transferred to The New School for Social Research in New York City, which awarded him a bachelor's degree in literature and political science in 1951.

Falk traveled in Europe and worked on a railroad in Yugoslavia for six months. He returned to New York, enrolling at Syracuse University, but he recalled in his 2006 memoir, Just One More Thing, that he was unsure what he wanted to do with his life for years after leaving high school.

Falk obtained a Master of Public Administration degree at the Maxwell School of Syracuse University in 1953. The program was designed to train civil servants for the federal government, a career that Falk said in his memoir he had "no interest in and no aptitude for".

Career

Early career
He applied for a job with the CIA, but he was rejected because of his membership in the Marine Cooks and Stewards Union while serving in the Merchant Marine, even though he was required to join and was not active in the union (which had been under fire for communist leanings). He then became a management analyst with the Connecticut State Budget Bureau in Hartford. In 1997, Falk characterized his Hartford job as "efficiency expert": "I was such an efficiency expert that the first morning on the job, I couldn't find the building where I was to report for work. Naturally, I was late, which I always was in those days, but ironically it was my tendency never to be on time that got me started as a professional actor."

Stage career

While working in Hartford, Falk joined a community theater group called the Mark Twain Masquers, where he performed in plays that included The Caine Mutiny Court-Martial, The Crucible, and The Country Girl by Clifford Odets. Falk also studied with Eva Le Gallienne, who was giving an acting class at the White Barn Theatre in Westport, Connecticut. Falk later recalled how he "lied his way" into the class, which was for professional actors. He drove down to Westport from Hartford every Wednesday, when the classes were held, and was usually late. In his 1997 interview with Arthur Marx in Cigar Aficionado Magazine, Falk said of Le Gallienne: "One evening when I arrived late, she looked at me and asked, 'Young man, why are you always late?' and I said, 'I have to drive down from Hartford.'" She looked down her nose and said, "What do you do in Hartford? There's no theater there. How do you make a living acting?" Falk confessed he was not a professional actor. According to him Le Gallienne looked at him sternly and said: "Well, you should be." He drove back to Hartford and quit his job. Falk stayed with the Le Gallienne group for a few months more, and obtained a letter of recommendation from Le Galliene to an agent at the William Morris Agency in New York. In 1956, he left his job with the Budget Bureau and moved to Greenwich Village to pursue an acting career.

Falk's first New York stage role was in an Off-Broadway production of Molière's Don Juan at the Fourth Street Theatre that closed after its only performance on January 3, 1956. Falk played the second lead, Sganarelle. His next theater role proved far better for his career. In May, he appeared at Circle in the Square in a revival of The Iceman Cometh with Jason Robards playing the bartender.

Later in 1956, Falk made his Broadway debut, appearing in Alexander Ostrovsky's Diary of a Scoundrel. As the year came to an end, he appeared again on Broadway as an English soldier in Shaw's Saint Joan with Siobhán McKenna. Falk continued to act in summer stock theater productions, including a staging of Arnold Schulman's A Hole in the Head, at the Colonie Summer Theatre (near Albany, NY) in July 1962, which also starred Priscilla Morrill.

In 1972, Falk appeared in Broadway's The Prisoner of Second Avenue. According to film historian Ephraim Katz: "His characters derive added authenticity from his squinty gaze, the result of the loss of an eye ...".

Early films

Despite his stage success, a theatrical agent advised Falk not to expect much film acting work because of his artificial eye. He failed a screen test at Columbia Pictures and was told by studio boss Harry Cohn: "For the same price I can get an actor with two eyes." He also failed to get a role in the film Marjorie Morningstar, despite a promising interview for the second lead. His first film performances were in small roles in Wind Across the Everglades (1958), The Bloody Brood (1959) and Pretty Boy Floyd (1960). Falk's performance in Murder, Inc. (1960) was a turning point in his career. He was cast in the supporting role of killer Abe Reles in a film based on the real-life murder gang of that name that terrorized New York in the 1930s. The New York Times film critic Bosley Crowther, while dismissing the movie as "an average gangster film", singled out Falk's "amusingly vicious performance". Crowther wrote:

The film turned out to be Falk's breakout role. In his autobiography, Just One More Thing (2006), Falk said his selection for the film from thousands of other Off-Broadway actors was a "miracle" that "made my career" and that without it, he would not have received the other significant movie roles that he later played. Falk, who played Reles again in the 1960 TV series The Witness, was nominated for a Best Supporting Actor Academy Award for his performance in the film.

In 1961, multiple Academy Award-winning director Frank Capra cast Falk in the comedy Pocketful of Miracles. The film was Capra's last feature, and although it was not the commercial success he hoped it would be, he "gushed about Falk's performance". Falk was nominated for an Oscar for the role. In his autobiography, Capra wrote about Falk:

For his part, Falk says he "never worked with a director who showed greater enjoyment of actors and the acting craft. There is nothing more important to an actor than to know that the one person who represents the audience to you, the director, is responding well to what you are trying to do." Falk once recalled how Capra reshot a scene even though he yelled "Cut and Print," indicating the scene was finalized. When Falk asked him why he wanted it reshot: "He laughed and said that he loved the scene so much he just wanted to see us do it again. How's that for support!"

For the remainder of the 1960s, Falk had mainly supporting movie roles and TV guest-starring appearances. Falk turned in a gem of a performance as one of two cabbies who falls victim to greed in the epic 1963 star-studded comedy It's a Mad, Mad, Mad, Mad World, although he only appears in the last fifth of the movie. His other roles included the character of Guy Gisborne in the Rat Pack musical comedy Robin and the 7 Hoods (1964), in which he sings one of the film's numbers, and the spoof The Great Race (1965) with Jack Lemmon and Tony Curtis.

Early television roles

Falk first appeared on television in 1957, in the dramatic anthology programs that later became known as the "Golden Age of Television". In 1957, he appeared in one episode of Robert Montgomery Presents. He was also cast in Studio One, Kraft Television Theater, New York Confidential, Naked City, The Untouchables, Have Gun–Will Travel, The Islanders, and Decoy with Beverly Garland cast as the first female police officer in a series lead. Falk often portrayed unsavory characters on television during the early 1960s. In The Twilight Zone episode "The Mirror," Falk starred as a paranoid Castro-type revolutionary who, intoxicated with power, begins seeing would-be assassins in a mirror. He also starred in two of Alfred Hitchcock's television series, as a gangster terrified of death in a 1961 episode of Alfred Hitchcock Presents and as a homicidal evangelist in 1962's The Alfred Hitchcock Hour.

In 1961, Falk was nominated for an Emmy Award for his performance in the episode "Cold Turkey" of James Whitmore's short-lived series The Law and Mr. Jones on ABC. On September 29, 1961, Falk and Walter Matthau guest-starred in the premiere episode, "The Million Dollar Dump", of ABC's crime drama Target: The Corruptors, with Stephen McNally and Robert Harland. He won an Emmy for The Price of Tomatoes, a drama carried in 1962 on The Dick Powell Show.

In 1961, Falk earned the distinction of becoming the first actor to be nominated for an Oscar and an Emmy in the same year. He received nominations for his supporting roles in Murder, Inc. and television program The Law and Mr. Jones. Incredibly, Falk repeated this double nomination in 1962, being nominated again for a supporting actor role in Pocketful of Miracles and best actor in "The Price of Tomatoes," an episode of The Dick Powell Theatre, for which he took home the award.

In 1963, Falk and Tommy Sands appeared as brothers who disagreed on the route for a railroad in "The Gus Morgan Story" on ABC's Wagon Train. Falk played the title role of "Gus", and Sands was his younger brother, Ethan Morgan. Ethan accidentally shoots wagonmaster Chris Hale, played by John McIntire, while the brothers are in the mountains looking at possible route options. Gus makes the decision to leave Hale behind- even choking him, believing he is dead. Ethan has been overcome with oxygen deprivation and needs Gus's assistance to reach safety down the mountain. Unknown to the Morgans, Hale crawls down the mountain through snow, determined to obtain revenge against Gus. In time, though, Hale comes to understand the difficult choice Morgan had to make, and the brothers reconcile their own differences. This episode is remembered for its examination of how far a man will persist amid adversity to preserve his own life and that of his brother.

Having had many roles in film and television during the early 1960s, Falk's first lead in a television series came with CBS's The Trials of O'Brien. The show ran from 1965 to 1966, its 22 episodes featuring Falk as a Shakespeare-quoting lawyer who defends clients while solving mysteries. In 1966, he also co-starred in a television production of "Brigadoon" with Robert Goulet.

In 1971, Pierre Cossette produced the first Grammy Awards show on television with some help from Falk. Cossette writes in his autobiography, "What meant the most to me, though, is the fact that Peter Falk saved my ass. I love show business, and I love Peter Falk."

Columbo

Although Falk appeared in numerous other television roles in the 1960s and 1970s, he is best known as the star of the TV series Columbo, "everyone's favorite rumpled television detective". His character, known for his catch-phrase Just one more thing, was a shabby and deceptively absent-minded police detective lieutenant driving a Peugeot 403, who had first appeared in the 1968 film Prescription: Murder. Columbo was created by William Link and Richard Levinson. Rather than a whodunit, the show typically revealed the murderer from the beginning, then showed how the Los Angeles homicide detective went about solving the crime. Falk would describe his role to film historian and author David Fantle:

Television critic Ben Falk (no relation) added that Falk "created an iconic cop … who always got his man (or woman) after a tortuous cat-and-mouse investigation". He also noted the idea for the character was "apparently inspired by Dostoyevsky's dogged police inspector, Porfiry Petrovich, in the novel Crime and Punishment".

Peter Falk tries to analyze the character and notes the correlation between his own personality and Columbo's:

With "general amazement", Falk notes: "The show is all over the world. I've been to little villages in Africa with maybe one TV set, and little kids will run up to me shouting, 'Columbo, Columbo!'" Singer Johnny Cash recalled acting in one episode, and although he was not an experienced actor, he writes in his autobiography, "Peter Falk was good to me. I wasn't at all confident about handling a dramatic role, and every day he helped me in all kinds of little ways."

The first episode of Columbo as a series was directed in 1971 by a 24-year-old Steven Spielberg in one of his earliest directing jobs. Falk recalled the episode to Spielberg biographer Joseph McBride:

The character of Columbo had previously been played by Bert Freed in a single television episode of The Chevy Mystery Show in 1960, and by Thomas Mitchell on Broadway. Falk first played Columbo in Prescription: Murder, a 1968 TV movie, and the 1970 pilot for the series, Ransom for a Dead Man. From 1971 to 1978, Columbo aired regularly on NBC as part of the umbrella series NBC Mystery Movie. All episodes were of TV movie length, in a 90- or 120-minute slot including commercials. In 1989, the show returned on ABC in the form of a less frequent series of TV movies, still starring Falk, airing until 2003. Falk won four Emmys for his role as Columbo.

Columbo was so popular, co-creator William Link wrote a series of short stories published as The Columbo Collection (Crippen & Landru, 2010) which includes a drawing by Falk of himself as Columbo, while the cover features a caricature of Falk/Columbo by Al Hirschfeld.

Lieutenant Columbo owns a Basset Hound named Dog. Originally, it was not going to appear in the show because Peter Falk believed that it ‘already had enough gimmicks’ but once the two met, Falk stated that Dog ‘was exactly the type of dog that Columbo would own,’ so he was added to the show and made his first appearance in 1972's "Étude In Black".

Columbo's wardrobe was personally provided by Peter Falk; they were his own clothes, including the high-topped shoes and the shabby raincoat, which made its first appearance in Prescription: Murder. Falk would often ad lib his character's idiosyncrasies (fumbling through his pockets for a piece of evidence and discovering a grocery list, asking to borrow a pencil, becoming distracted by something irrelevant in the room at a dramatic point in a conversation with a suspect, etc.), inserting these into his performance as a way to keep his fellow actors off-balance. He felt it helped to make their confused and impatient reactions to Columbo's antics more genuine. According to Levinson, the catchphrase "one more thing" was conceived when he and Link were writing the play: "we had a scene that was too short, and we'd already had Columbo make his exit. We were too lazy to retype the scene, so we had him come back and say, 'Oh, just one more thing . . .' It was never planned."

Columbo featured an unofficial signature tune, the children's song "This Old Man". It was introduced in the episode "Any Old Port in a Storm" in 1973 and the detective can be heard humming or whistling it often in subsequent films. Peter Falk admitted that it was a melody he personally enjoyed and one day it became a part of his character. The tune was also used in various score arrangements throughout the three decades of the series, including opening and closing credits. A version of it, titled "Columbo", was created by one of the show's composers, Patrick Williams.

A few years prior to his death, Falk had expressed interest in returning to the role. In 2007, he said he had chosen a script for one last Columbo episode, "Columbo: Hear No Evil". The script was renamed "Columbo's Last Case". ABC declined the project. In response, producers for the series announced that they were attempting to shop the project to foreign production companies. However, Falk was diagnosed with dementia in late 2007. Falk died on June 23, 2011, aged 83.

Peter Falk won four Emmy Awards for his portrayal of Lieutenant Columbo in 1972, 1975, 1976 and 1990. Falk directed just one episode: the highly acclaimed "Blueprint for Murder" in 1971, although it is rumored that he and John Cassavetes were largely responsible for direction duties on "Etude in Black" in 1972. Falk's own favorite Columbo episodes were "Any Old Port in a Storm", "Forgotten Lady", "Now You See Him" and "Identity Crisis". Falk was rumored to be earning $300,000 per episode when he returned for Season 6 of Columbo in 1976. This doubled to $600,000 per episode when the series made its comeback in 1989. In 1997, "Murder by the Book" was ranked at No. 16 in TV Guides '100 Greatest Episodes of All Time' list. Two years later, the magazine ranked Lieutenant Columbo No. 7 on its '50 Greatest TV Characters of All Time' list.

Later career

Falk was a close friend of independent film director John Cassavetes and appeared in his films Husbands, A Woman Under the Influence, and, in a cameo, at the end of Opening Night. Cassavetes guest-starred in the Columbo episode "Étude in Black" in 1972; Falk, in turn, co-starred with Cassavetes in the 1976 film Mikey and Nicky. Falk describes his experiences working with Cassavetes, specifically remembering his directing strategies: "Shooting an actor when he might be unaware the camera was running." 

In 1978, Falk appeared on the comedy TV show The Dean Martin Celebrity Roast, portraying his Columbo character, with Frank Sinatra the evening's victim. Director William Friedkin said of Falk's role in his film The Brink's Job (1978): "Peter has a great range from comedy to drama. He could break your heart or he could make you laugh."

Falk continued to work in films, including his performance as an ex-CIA officer of questionable sanity in the comedy The In-Laws. Director Arthur Hiller said during an interview that the "film started out because Alan Arkin and Peter Falk wanted to work together. They went to Warner Brothers and said, 'We'd like to do a picture', and Warner said fine ... and out came The In-laws ... of all the films I've done, The In-laws is the one I get the most comments on." Movie critic Roger Ebert compared the film with a later remake:

Falk appeared in The Great Muppet Caper, The Princess Bride, Murder by Death, The Cheap Detective, Vibes, Made, and in Wim Wenders' 1987 German language film Wings of Desire and its 1993 sequel, Faraway, So Close!. In Wings of Desire, Falk played a semi-fictionalized version of himself, a famous American actor who had once been an angel, but who had grown disillusioned with only observing life on Earth and had in turn given up his immortality. Falk described the role as "the craziest thing that I've ever been offered", but he earned critical acclaim for his supporting performance in the film.

In 1998, Falk returned to the New York stage to star in an Off-Broadway production of Arthur Miller's Mr. Peters' Connections. His previous stage work included shady real estate salesman Shelley "the Machine" Levine in the 1986 Boston/Los Angeles production of David Mamet's prizewinning Glengarry Glen Ross.

Falk starred in a trilogy of holiday television movies – A Town Without Christmas (2001), Finding John Christmas (2003), and When Angels Come to Town (2004) – in which he portrayed Max, a quirky guardian angel who uses disguises and subterfuge to steer his charges onto the right path. In 2005, he starred in The Thing About My Folks. Although movie critic Roger Ebert was not impressed with most of the other actors, he wrote in his review: "... We discover once again what a warm and engaging actor Peter Falk is. I can't recommend the movie, but I can be grateful that I saw it, for Falk." In 2007, Falk appeared with Nicolas Cage in the thriller Next.

Falk's autobiography, Just One More Thing, was published in 2006.

Personal life

Falk married Alyce Mayo, whom he met when the two were students at Syracuse University, on April 17, 1960. The couple adopted two daughters, Catherine (who was to become a private investigator) and Jackie. Falk and his wife divorced in 1976. On December 7, 1977, he married actress Shera Danese, who guest-starred in more episodes of the Columbo series than any other actress.

Falk was an accomplished artist, and in October 2006 he had an exhibition of his drawings at the Butler Institute of American Art. He took classes at the Art Students League of New York for many years.

Falk was a chess aficionado and a spectator at the American Open in Santa Monica, California, in November 1972, and at the U.S. Open in Pasadena, California, in August 1983.

His memoir Just One More Thing was published by Carroll & Graf on August 23, 2006.

Health

In December 2008 it was reported that Falk had been diagnosed with Alzheimer's disease. In June 2009, at a two-day conservatorship trial in Los Angeles, one of Falk's personal physicians, Dr. Stephen Read, reported he had rapidly slipped into dementia after a series of dental operations in 2007. Dr. Read said it was unclear whether Falk's condition had worsened as a result of anesthesia or some other reaction to the operations. Shera Danese Falk was appointed as her husband's conservator.

Death
On the evening of June 23, 2011, Falk died at his longtime home on Roxbury Drive in Beverly Hills at the age of 83. His death was primarily caused by pneumonia, with complications of Alzheimer's being a secondary and underlying cause. His daughters said they would remember his "wisdom and humor". He is buried at Westwood Village Memorial Park Cemetery in Los Angeles, California.

His death was marked by tributes from many film celebrities including Jonah Hill and Stephen Fry. Steven Spielberg said, "I learned more about acting from him at that early stage of my career than I had from anyone else". Rob Reiner said: "He was a completely unique actor", and went on to say that Falk's work with Alan Arkin in The In-Laws was "one of the most brilliant comedy pairings we've seen on screen". His epitaph reads "I'm not here, I'm home with Shera."

Peter Falk's Law
According to Falk's daughter Catherine, his second wife Shera Danese (who also was his conservator), allegedly stopped some of his family members from visiting him; did not notify them of major changes in his condition; and did not notify them of his death and funeral arrangements. Catherine encouraged the passage in 2015 of legislation called colloquially "Peter Falk's Law".
The new law was passed in New York state to protect children from being cut off from news of serious medical and end-of-life developments regarding their parents or from contact with them. The law provides guidelines regarding visitation rights and notice of death with which an incapacitated person's guardians or conservators must comply. 

As of 2020, more than fifteen states had enacted such laws. In introducing the measure, Senator John DeFrancisco said, "For every wrong there should be a remedy. This bill gives a remedy to children of elderly and infirm parents who have been cut off from receiving information about their parents. It also gives them an avenue through the courts to obtain visitation rights with the parents."

Filmography

Film

Television

Theatre

Awards and nominations
Academy Awards

Primetime Emmy Awards

Golden Globe Awards

Bibliography
 .

Further reading
 Richard A. Lertzman & William J Birnes (2017). Beyond Columbo: The life and times of Peter Falk. Shadow Lawn Press.

Notes

References

External links

 
 
 
 
 
 
 
 
 
 
 

1927 births
2011 deaths
20th-century American male actors
21st-century American male actors
American male film actors
American male stage actors
American male television actors
American male voice actors
American memoirists
American people of Czech-Jewish descent
American people of Hungarian-Jewish descent
American people of Polish-Jewish descent
American people of Russian-Jewish descent
American sailors
Best Drama Actor Golden Globe (television) winners
Burials at Westwood Village Memorial Park Cemetery
Columbo
Deaths from Alzheimer's disease
Jewish American male actors
Male actors from New York City
Maxwell School of Citizenship and Public Affairs alumni
Deaths from dementia in California
Military personnel from New York City
Military personnel from New York (state)
Outstanding Performance by a Lead Actor in a Drama Series Primetime Emmy Award winners
Outstanding Performance by a Lead Actor in a Miniseries or Movie Primetime Emmy Award winners
People from Ossining, New York
Television producers from New York City
The New School alumni
United States Merchant Mariners of World War II